Ann Cummins is an American fiction writer. She was born in Durango, Colorado, and grew up in New Mexico. She is a graduate of writing programs at Johns Hopkins University and the University of Arizona. She is the author of a short story collection, Red Ant House (2003), and a novel, Yellowcake (Houghton Mifflin, 2007). Cummins lives in Flagstaff, Arizona, where she teaches creative writing at Northern Arizona University, and in Oakland, California, with her husband, the musician S. E. Willis.

Yellowcake is about two families, Irish-catholic and Navajo, that are struggling with the laws of uranium mining.

In 2002 Cummins was a recipient of a Lannan Foundation Literary Fellowship.

References

Further reading
 "Illuminating the Landscape of Loneliness" from The Santa Fe New Mexican
 "'Yellowcake' rises from family ties" from Contra Costa Times
 Walking the twilight: women writers of the Southwest, p. 44
 The Prentice Hall anthology of women's literature, p. 1065
 World authors, 2000–2005, p. 141

External links
 Cummins's biography at Northern Arizona University

21st-century American novelists
American women short story writers
American women novelists
Novelists from Colorado
Northern Arizona University faculty
University of Arizona alumni
Johns Hopkins University alumni
People from Durango, Colorado
People from New Mexico
Year of birth missing (living people)
Living people
21st-century American women writers
21st-century American short story writers
American women academics